3 Inches of Blood was a Canadian heavy metal band formed in 1999 in Victoria, British Columbia, last consisting of Cam Pipes, Justin Hagberg, Shane Clark, and Ash Pearson, none of whom were original members of the band. Their music was strongly influenced by the new wave of British heavy metal movement.

History

Early years, and Battlecry Under a Wintersun 
The group began when Jamie Hooper, Sunny Dhak, and Bobby Froese, along with Geoff Trawick and Rich Trawick filling in on drums and bass, got together to do a one-off reunion gig for an old group of theirs, but things went so well with writing new material in a traditional metal style that they decided to continue under a new moniker. Rich Trawick's roommate, Steve Bays (keyboard player for Hot Hot Heat), heard the demo of the band's first recording and suggested having his friend Cam Pipes overdub some clean vocals to it. Pipes overdubbed additional vocals to what became the band's first EP, Sect of the White Worm, and became a permanent band member. 

Their debut album Battlecry Under a Wintersun was recorded in 2002 and released in cooperation with Teenage Rampage Records and the label Fashion Before Function. (It was later remastered and re-released by the band under their own label, Minion Music.) The album had moderate underground success in the Canadian market, ranking on national college radio charts and winning Metal Album of Year at the 2002 Canadian Independent Music Awards. The band garnered international exposure when its UK distribution label put them on as a support slot for a tour with rock band The Darkness. This exposure garnered critical attention and acclaim in the world of underground metal, and they were signed by Roadrunner Records in 2004.

Advance and Vanquish 2004-2005 

In 2004, Geoff Trawick and Rich Trawick left the band due to personal differences with the rest of the band and professional differences with Roadrunner Records. Matt Wood of Vancouver doom/sludge/noise band Goatsblood, and Brian Redman replaced them. Soon after, just after recording the band's second album Advance and Vanquish, Sunny Dhak and Bob Froese left the band. Wood was replaced by Alexei Rodriguez. (Dhak, Froese and Wood and, with Mike Payette, then founded the band Pride Tiger.)

Dhak and Froese were replaced by Justin Hagberg, who had previously played with Pipes in Allfather, a black metal band, and Shane Clark. Roadrunner put out an advertising blitz, and the track "Deadly Sinners" from Advance and Vanquish appeared on numerous sampler CDs, compilations, and in three video games (Tony Hawk's Underground 2, Saints Row 2, and Brütal Legend). This created huge press hype for the band and Roadrunner put them on the 2005 Road Rage Tour.

Also in 2005, Justin Hagberg recorded the guitars on the tracks "Dawn of a Golden Age" and "I Don't Wanna Be (A Superhero)" for Roadrunner United: The All Star Sessions. In October 2006, at the Verizon Wireless Amphitheatre in Irvine, California, the band opened for Iron Maiden during the United States leg of their 2006 A Matter of Life and Death World Tour.

Fire Up the Blades 2006-2008 
The band wrote their third studio album, Fire Up the Blades, in Tacoma, Washington and performed their new songs at various places in Washington. By December 2006, they were recording at Vancouver's Armoury Studios, with Joey Jordison, drummer of Slipknot as producer. A demo of "Goatrider's Horde", which was recorded in Seattle in the spring of 2006, was made available for streaming on Roadrunner's official website, and a demo of "Night Marauders" appeared in the fifth Battle Metal compilation album, The Final Conflict, released in 2007 in issue 161 of the UK magazine Metal Hammer.

The band toured the United States during January and February 2007 in support of Cradle of Filth with The 69 Eyes and, in March, toured the UK with Biomechanical opening for them. On March 22, 2007, the band was confirmed to play the second stage at Ozzfest. 

Prior to the release of Fire Up the Blades, the band stressed that the album would be "darker, tighter and more dangerous" than their Roadrunner Records debut. "This album is heavily influenced by low quality beer, bong rips and listening to black metal in the dark", said Hooper. "It doesn't sound blatantly black metal, it still sounds like us. But it's a faster, more intense version of us." 

Fire Up the Blades was released in Japan on May 28, 2007, and worldwide on June 26, 2007. It reached No. 147 on the Billboard charts in the U.S. 

During the 2007 Ozzfest Tour, Jamie Hooper was unable to sing with the band as he was experiencing throat problems. He did not perform on the Ozzfest tour or the Operation Annihilation tour; he quit the band in 2008. Harsh vocal duties were taken over by Hagberg.

At the 2007 Hard Rock Hell festival in the UK, drummer Alexei Rodriguez got into a fight with Saxon drummer Nigel Glockler. The fight left Glockler with broken glasses and a black eye; the security guards who intervened put Rodriguez in hospital with a broken elbow. 3 Inches of Blood fired Rodriguez, apologized for his behavior and replaced him with Ash Pearson (of Sound Of the Swarm & Just Cause). Also in 2007, Brian Redman left the band (he would pass away in 2009, at age 31); he was replaced by bassist Nick Cates.

Here Waits Thy Doom 2009-2011 

With Hooper gone, 3 Inches of Blood's fourth album Here Waits Thy Doom, was their first album not to feature any original members. It reached No. 195 on the US Billboard charts.

The song "Beware The Preacher's Daughter" features all four members of fellow Canadian Metal band Bison B.C. (James Farwell, Dan And, Masa Anzai and Brad MacKinnon) singing gang vocals on the chorus.

3 Inches of Blood was featured in Rockstar's Mayhem Festival 2010, and the band released a music video for the song "Silent Killer".

Long Live Heavy Metal 
On March 26, 2012, the band released their final album, Long Live Heavy Metal. CAN No. 92 They toured the US and the UK and, that August, opened for Metallica in Vancouver. In 2013, they toured with Goatwhore, Death Angel and Battlecross, among others.

Breakup 
On June 2, 2015, the band announced it would be disbanding following two final shows, which took place on November 7 and 8 at the Commodore Ballroom in Vancouver.
Pearson joined Revocation

Discography
Albums
 Battlecry Under a Wintersun (2002)
 Advance and Vanquish (2004)
 Fire Up the Blades (2007) 
 Here Waits Thy Doom (2009) 
 Long Live Heavy Metal (2012)

EPs
 Sect of the White Worm (2001)
 Road Rage Tour 2004 (2004), compilation with Machine Head, Chimaira & Trivium
 Trial of Champions (2007)
 Anthems for the Victorious (2011)

Singles
 "Ride Darkhorse, Ride" (2002)
 "Destroy the Orcs" (2003)
 "Deadly Sinners" (2004)
 "The Goatriders Horde" (2007)
 "Trial of Champions" (2007)
 "Battles and Brotherhood" (2009)
 "Silent Killer" (2010)
 "Call of the Hammer" / Everything's Legal in Alabama", split with Bob Wayne (2011)
 "Metal Woman"  (2012)
 "Live at Mushroom: Vol. I" (2013)
 "Live at Mushroom: Vol. II" (2013)
 "Live at Mushroom: Vol. III" (2013)

Band members

Final lineup
 Cam Pipes – clean vocals , bass 
 Shane Clark – lead guitar 
 Justin Hagberg – rhythm guitar , screamed vocals 
 Ash Pearson – drums 
 Nick Cates – bass 

Former members
 Jamie Hooper – screamed vocals 
 Sunny Dhak – lead guitar 
 Bobby Froese – rhythm guitar 
 Rich Trawick – bass 
 Geoff Trawick – drums 
 Jay Watts – guitars 
 Brian Redman – bass 
 Matt Wood – drums 
 Alexei Rodriguez – drums 

Live members
 Steve Ericson – bass 
 Aaron "Boon" Gustafson – bass 
 Byron Stroud – bass 
 Pete Griffin – bass 
 Matt C - Drums live  

Timeline

References

External links

Official website (archived)

2000 establishments in British Columbia
Articles which contain graphical timelines
Canadian heavy metal musical groups
Canadian power metal musical groups
Canadian thrash metal musical groups
Century Media Records artists
Musical groups established in 2000
Musical groups disestablished in 2015
Musical groups from Victoria, British Columbia
Musical quintets